In geometry, the elongated square cupola is one of the Johnson solids. As the name suggests, it can be constructed by elongating a square cupola by attaching an octagonal prism to its base. The solid can be seen as a rhombicuboctahedron with its "lid" (another square cupola) removed.

Formulae
The following formulae for volume, surface area and circumradius can be used if all faces are regular, with edge length a:

Dual polyhedron 

The dual of the elongated square cupola has 20 faces: 8 isosceles triangles, 4 kites, 8 quadrilaterals.

Related polyhedra and honeycombs

The elongated square cupola forms space-filling honeycombs with tetrahedra and cubes; with cubes and cuboctahedra; and with tetrahedra, elongated square pyramids, and elongated square bipyramids. (The latter two units can be decomposed into cubes and square pyramids.)

References

External links
 

Johnson solids